Civitas sine suffragio (Latin, "citizenship without the vote") was a level of citizenship in the Roman Republic which granted all the rights of Roman citizenship except the right to vote in popular assemblies. This status was first extended to some of the city-states which had been incorporated into the Republic following the break-up of the Latin League in 338 BCE. It became the standard Romanization policy for incorporating conquered regions in building the Roman Empire.

See also
 Metic
 Denization
 Permanent resident

References

Sources

Velasco, J.C. (2010): "Civitas sine suffragio" 

Roman citizenship